Charles Beard may refer to:
 Charles Edmund Beard (1900–1982), CEO and President Braniff International Airways
 Charles A. Beard (1874–1948), American historian
 Edmund Charles Beard (1894–1974), British Major-General during the Second World War
 Charles E. Beard (1920–2006), librarian in Georgia, U.S.
 Charles Taschereau Beard (1890–1948), Canadian naval officer and politician
 Charles Beard (Unitarian) (1827–1888), English Unitarian divine, vice-president of University College, Liverpool
 Charles Beard (priest) (1870–1943), Dean of Glasgow and Galloway
 Dave Beard (Charles David Beard, born 1959), former pitcher in Major League Baseball

See also